Senecio tripinnatifidus is a species of the genus Senecio and family Asteraceae and is a native of Chile.

References

External links

tripinnatifidus
Flora of Chile